The attorney general of Afghanistan is a legal post in the government of Afghanistan.

Under the 2004 Constitution of Afghanistan, the attorney general was the government's chief legal advisor and was also the nation's top prosecutor. After taking over the government in 2021, the Taliban transferred responsibility for the prosecution of crimes to the country's judiciary. The Taliban has appointed an acting attorney general, Shamsulldin Shariati, but it is unclear what his responsibilities are.

List of attorneys general of Afghanistan

Address 
 Attorney General's Office, Share Naw, Kabul, Afghanistan
 http://ago.gov.af/

See also
Attorney General

References

External links
http://ago.gov.af/
http://president.gov.af/
https://ago.gov.af/biography-attorney-general-02

 
Government ministries of Afghanistan
Law of Afghanistan
Law enforcement in Afghanistan